Argentonnay is a small town and commune in the Deux-Sèvres department of western France. The municipality was established on 1 January 2016 and consists of the former communes of Argenton-les-Vallées, Le Breuil-sous-Argenton, La Chapelle-Gaudin, La Coudre, Moutiers-sous-Argenton and Ulcot.

See also 
Communes of the Deux-Sèvres department

References 

Communes of Deux-Sèvres
Populated places established in 2016
2016 establishments in France